Syrian Orthodox refers to the Syriac Orthodox Church, centered in Damascus, in modern Syria.

Syrian Orthodox may also refer to:
 Eastern Orthodoxy in Syria, the Eastern Orthodox Church in Syria, primarily:
 Greek Orthodox Church of Antioch, centered in Damascus, in modern Syria
 Jacobite Syrian Christian Church, one of Oriental Orthodox Churches in India
 Malankara Orthodox Syrian Church, one of Oriental Orthodox Churches in India

See also
 
 Syrian Christians (disambiguation)
 Syrian (disambiguation)
 Syria (disambiguation)